Highway To Dhampus is a romantic drama movie by producer John de Blas Williams and director Rick McFarland. Actors include Gunner Wright, who had previously worked on the movie ‘Love’ and as the voice of Isaac Clarke in the Dead Space franchise, and Nepalese movie star Raj Ballav Koirala.

Plot
Film Tagline: 

We look at the sky, but we walk on the ground.

Summary: 

When Laxmi, headmistress of a small orphanage in Nepal, is visited by a rich socialite attempting to fix her image through charitable acts, a chain of events is set in motion that affects everyone involved. Ajit, the western-savvy bush pilot, Colt, the American photojournalist and chaperone, and even Elizabeth, the spoiled British heiress, all discover their own reasons to ultimately change for the better.

Cast
 Rachel Hurd-Wood as Elizabeth James
 Gunner Wright as Colt Morgan
 Suesha Rana as Laxmi
 Raj Ballav Koirala as Ajit Thapa
 Deshbhakta Khanal as Mahendra Sharma
 Sayush Gurung Bajracharya as Prabhujee
 Sophie McShera  as Ginny Topham
 Vinzenz Kiefer as Nino Neumann
 Masha Tokareva  as Sabina Kretchman
 Sunil Shrestha as Arjun

References

External links 

 
 
 Highway to Dhampus Movie Review from The Salt Lake Tribune

2015 films
American drama films
American independent films
Films shot in Nepal
Films set in Nepal
British drama films
British independent films
Films shot in Pokhara
2010s English-language films
2010s American films
2010s British films
2015 independent films